United Nations Security Council resolution 1287, adopted unanimously on 31 January 2000, after reaffirming all resolutions on Georgia, particularly Resolution 1255 (1999), the Council extended the mandate of the United Nations Observer Mission in Georgia (UNOMIG) until 31 July 2000.

The security council emphasised the unacceptability of the lack of progress with key issues relating to the Abkhazia conflict. It welcomed recent commitments from both parties to investigate violations of the 1994 Agreement on a Cease-fire and Separation of Forces and resume negotiations. There was concern that although the situation remained calm, the situation in the conflict zone was volatile. Efforts to address prevention and control of diseases such as HIV/AIDS and others was welcomed.

The Secretary-General Kofi Annan had appointed a new special representative and the parties were encouraged to use the opportunity to connect to resume the peace process. Both Georgia and Abkhazia were urged to achieve progress on key issues such as the distribution of constitutional competences between Tbilisi and Sukhumi.

The resolution reiterated the need for the respect of human rights by both parties, the importance of implementing confidence-building measures, and that elections in Abkhazia were unacceptable and illegitimate. The Secretary-General was requested to report regularly on developments to the council.

See also
 Georgian–Abkhazian conflict
 List of United Nations Security Council Resolutions 1201 to 1300 (1998–2000)
 United Nations resolutions on Abkhazia

References

External links
 
Text of the Resolution at undocs.org

 1287
Abkhaz–Georgian conflict
2000 in Georgia (country)
2000 in Abkhazia
 1287